Revenge of the Boarding School Dropouts is a 2009 snowboarding film and a sequel to Shred (2008) that stars Tom Green and Dave England. It was filmed at Big White Ski Resort in British Columbia, Canada.

Plot
Revenge of the Boarding School Dropouts finds the young riders from the first film living the life of rock stars, with photo shoots, video stardom and parties threatening the will of the team to stay together and maintain their commitment to the true essence of the sport.

Their nemesis Kingsley Brown and his sidekick Spinks are back again attempting to throw a wrench into the works for Max & Eddie's riders, but this time they have even more tricks up their sleeves.

Cast
 Tom Green as Kingsley Brown
 Dave England as Max Fisher
 Carlo Marks as Chris James
 Amber Borycki as Tracy
 Alain Chanoine as Juice
 Shane Meier as Sphinx
 Juan Riedinger as K-Dog
 Kyle Labine as Mikey
 Pascale Hutton as Danielle  
 Lindsay Maxwell as Lisa
 Jason Bothe as Eddy

References

External links
 

2009 comedy films
English-language Canadian films
Direct-to-video sequel films
2009 films
Canadian skiing films
Canadian sports comedy films
2000s English-language films
2000s Canadian films